Quiina is a genus of plant in family Ochnaceae. It contains the following species (but this list may be incomplete):
 Quiina amazonica A.C.Sm.
 Quiina berryi J.V.Schneid. & Zizka
 Quiina blackii Pires
 Quiina brevensis Pires
 Quiina cidiana J.V.Schneid. & Zizka
 Quiina congesta R.S.Cowan
 Quiina cruegeriana Griseb.
 Quiina decaisneana Planch. & Triana
 Quiina duckei Pires
 Quiina florida Tul.
 Quiina gentryi J.V.Schneid. & Zizka
 Quiina glaziovii Engl.
 Quiina grandifolia Mildbr.
 Quiina guianensis Aubl.
 Quiina indigofera Sandwith
 Quiina integrifolia Pulle
 Quiina jamaicensis Griseb.
 Quiina juruana Ule
 Quiina klugii J.F.Macbr.
 Quiina lanceolata Dusén ex Ducke
 Quiina leptoclada Tul.
 Quiina longifolia Spruce ex Planch. & Triana
 Quiina macrophylla Tul.
 Quiina magallano-gomesii Schwacke
 Quiina maguirei Pires
 Quiina maracaensis J.V.Schneid. & Zizka
 Quiina negrensis A.C.Sm.
 Quiina obovata Tul.
 Quiina oiapocensis Pires
 Quiina paraensis Pires& Fróes
 Quiina parvifolia Lanj. & Heerdt
 Quiina piresii J.V.Schneid. & Zizka
 Quiina pteridophylla (Radlk.) Pires
 Quiina pubescens A.C.Sm.
 Quiina rhytidopus Tul.
 Quiina rigidifolia Pires
 Quiina sessilis Choisy, Planch. & Triana
 Quiina tessmannii Mildbr.
 Quiina tinifolia Planch. & Triana
 Quiina ulei Pulle
 Quiina wurdackii Pires
 Quiina yatuensis J.V.Schneid. & Zizka
 Quiina zamorensis J.V.Schneid. & Zizka

References

Ochnaceae
Malpighiales genera
Taxonomy articles created by Polbot